Eugenio Leal Vargas (born 13 May 1954) is a Spanish former footballer who played as a midfielder.

He spent most of his 12-year professional career with Atlético Madrid, appearing in more than 230 competitive games and winning two La Liga championships.

A Spain international for one year, Leal represented the country at the 1978 World Cup.

Club career
Born in Carriches, Province of Toledo, Castilla-La Mancha, Leal finished his youth career with Atlético Madrid. After alternating between the first team and the amateur reserves to start with, he was loaned to fellow La Liga team Sporting de Gijón, returning to the Vicente Calderón Stadium late into the 1973–74 season to play the Copa del Rey as the foreign players were not eligible for the tournament. He started playing football as a forward, but manager and former teammate Luis Aragonés reconverted him in a midfielder.

In a derby against Real Madrid in 1979, Leal suffered a knee ligament injury following a challenge from Juan Sol from which he never fully recovered. He left the Colchoneros in June 1982 after only eight games in two years and, after a few months at CE Sabadell FC to help them prevent relegation from Segunda División, which eventually did not befell, he retired at the age of 29.

Leal helped Atlético to the 1973 and 1977 domestic leagues, contributing a total of 42 matches and four goals to the achievements. After retiring, he settled in Granada and worked as a stockbroker.

International career
Leal earned the first of his 13 caps for Spain on 16 April 1977, in a 0–1 away loss against Romania for the 1978 FIFA World Cup qualifiers. Six months later, in the same phase and facing the same opponent, he scored in the 2–0 win in Madrid.

Selected to the finals in Argentina by coach László Kubala, Leal featured in three games in an eventual group stage exit.

International goals

Honours
Atlético Madrid
La Liga: 1972–73, 1976–77
Copa del Generalísimo: 1975–76
Intercontinental Cup: 1974

References

External links

1954 births
Living people
Sportspeople from the Province of Toledo
Spanish footballers
Footballers from Castilla–La Mancha
Association football midfielders
La Liga players
Segunda División players
Atlético Madrid footballers
Sporting de Gijón players
CE Sabadell FC footballers
Spain youth international footballers
Spain amateur international footballers
Spain international footballers
1978 FIFA World Cup players